Hélder Manuel Marques Postiga  (born 2 August 1982) is a Portuguese retired professional footballer who played as a striker.

After beginning at Porto, where he won eight items of silverware along the way, he amassed Primeira Liga totals of 195 games and 54 goals over 11 seasons, with that club, Sporting and Rio Ave. He also played in six foreign countries, most notably in Spain where he totalled 27 goals in 99 La Liga matches for three teams.

A Portuguese international since 2003, Postiga represented the country in two World Cups and three European Championships, helping the nation reach the final at Euro 2004.

Club career

Porto
Born in Vila do Conde, Postiga began his career at nearby Varzim SC. In 1995, he joined FC Porto's youth teams and continued to progress until he reached the reserve squad. At the time, coach Octávio Machado picked him for the first team on some occasions and the player performed well.

After José Mourinho was hired as Porto manager, Postiga became a first-team regular. The 20-year-old scored 19 times in 2002–03 playing alongside Derlei, as Porto won the double. This included 13 in a victorious league campaign as well as five in an eventual conquest of the UEFA Cup, although he missed the final due to suspension. Following his successful season, he made his senior international debut for Portugal.

Tottenham Hotspur
After the treble-winning season in 2003, Postiga moved to Premier League club Tottenham Hotspur for £6.25 million (€9 million), a fee that could have risen to £8.36 million (€12 million). He signed a five-year contract, with manager Glenn Hoddle remarking "He is a player who will add definite striking quality to our squad and is a young player of proven ability. I'm sure our supporters will enjoy watching him over the coming seasons."

Postiga made his debut on 16 August in a 0–1 defeat at Birmingham City, starting but being replaced by fellow new signing Bobby Zamora after 57 minutes. His first goal came on 3 December, the second of a 3–1 home win over Manchester City which put his team into the quarter-finals of the League Cup, while his only goal in 19 league games contributed to a 2–1 success against Liverpool on 17 January 2004, also at White Hart Lane.

Porto return

Postiga then returned to Porto in a deal that sent Pedro Mendes to Tottenham in exchange, with the striker being valued at €7.5 million. New coach Víctor Fernández included him in the team for the 2004–05 campaign, but he had another disappointing season; however, following José Couceiro's appointment as manager, he managed to score three goals before the end of the season.

In 2005, after a promising pre-season, Postiga was demoted to the club's B-team, because new coach Co Adriaanse was not happy with his performances. In January of the following year, trying to confirm his position in the Portuguese team for the 2006 World Cup, he moved, on loan, to AS Saint-Étienne, where he netted two Ligue 1 goals against FC Metz and Le Mans Union Club 72, both resulting in 1–0 away victories.

Postiga then returned to Porto for 2006–07 where, due to the managerial changes at the club, he found himself back in the first team. A regular starter in the beginning, he nonetheless fell out of favour towards the end of the season, losing his place to Brazilian Adriano though he still managed to score ten league goals; in his two spells, he appeared in 164 games all competitions comprised and netted 64 times.

In mid-January 2008, after having again fallen out of favour, Postiga moved to Panathinaikos F.C. for a six-month loan period. His first goal for the club came in the Athens derby against AEK Athens FC, in which he equalised (1–1).

Sporting
On 1 June 2008, it was announced that Postiga had made a shock move to Portuguese rivals Sporting CP, signing a three-year contract for a reported transfer fee of €2.5 million, with the Lisbon side acquiring 50% of the player's rights. On 1 September he scored his first official goal for his new club, the only in a victory at S.C. Braga.

Postiga's second season as a Lion was disastrous, both collectively – Sporting finished fourth – and individually (he failed to score in any official competition until 19 April 2010, when he netted the 2–1 home winner against Vitória de Setúbal after just one minute on the pitch); although he began as a starter, he soon lost his job to youth graduate Carlos Saleiro.

Zaragoza

On 31 August 2011, the last day of the summer transfer window, Postiga left Sporting, signing for Real Zaragoza in La Liga for €1 million. At the Spanish side, he reunited with countrymen Fernando Meira and Rúben Micael.

After three disallowed goals in as many matches, Postiga opened his scoring account for Zaragoza on 16 October 2011, netting twice in a 2–0 home win against Real Sociedad – this included a bicycle kick in the 11th minute of the game. He finished the season as club top scorer, in an eventual narrow escape from relegation.

On 10 November 2012, Postiga scored a brace to help the Aragonese to a 5–3 defeat of ten-men Deportivo de La Coruña. He netted a career-best 14 goals during the campaign, but his team was relegated.

Valencia
On 8 August 2013, Postiga joined Valencia CF for a fee of £2.6 million, replacing Tottenham-bound Roberto Soldado. On 1 September, in only the third match of the season, he netted twice late into the first half of the game against FC Barcelona at the Mestalla Stadium, but in an eventual 2–3 home loss.

Postiga was loaned to S.S. Lazio for the remainder of the campaign on 30 January 2014, with the option of a permanent move afterwards. He made his debut in Serie A on 26 March, playing 20 minutes in a 0–2 away loss to Genoa CFC.

Deportivo
On 1 September 2014, Postiga terminated his link with the Che, and subsequently signed a one-year deal with fellow league team Deportivo. He made his debut with his new club two weeks later, featuring the full 90 minutes in a 1–0 win at SD Eibar. His first goal for the Galicians came in his fifth match on 31 October: coming on at half time for Luis Fariña, he scored a consolation in a 1–2 home loss to Getafe CF. A week later, he was sent off in the 29th minute of a goalless draw at Córdoba CF, earning a second yellow card for a reaction when fouled by Íñigo López.

Postiga spent the better part of the season injured, as Depor went on to narrowly avoid relegation.

Atlético Kolkata
On 29 July 2015, Postiga signed as the marquee player of Indian Super League franchise Atlético de Kolkata; at 32, he was the youngest such player in the competition, and was deemed by the management to be less injury-prone than his predecessor Luis García. He made his debut on 3 October in the opening game of the season, scoring twice in a 3–2 win at Chennaiyin FC but leaving the game with an injury; he made no further appearances, as his team went on to be eliminated by precisely that opponent in the play-off semi-finals.

Rio Ave
On 1 February 2016, Postiga returned to his homeland, signing for top flight team Rio Ave F.C. until the end of the season. In his second match, 26 days later, he opened a 2–1 win at Boavista FC; it was his 50th goal in the division.

On 14 May 2016, in the last matchday, Postiga scored the winning goal as his team won 2–1 at C.F. União, qualifying themselves for the Europa League and relegating the opponents.

Return to Kolkata
On 12 August 2016, Postiga returned to Atlético Kolkata as their marquee player. Early in his second match of the season, away to Kerala Blasters FC on 5 October, he suffered another long-term injury; the club's ownership admitted that due to such concerns they had wanted a different figurehead.

Postiga returned to the team as they went on to win the championship, although he was substituted in the final.

International career

Postiga made his debut for the Portugal national team on 12 February 2003 in a friendly match with Italy, where he came on as a substitute for Tiago Mendes in the 70th minute – this game was also Luiz Felipe Scolari's first as manager. He was handed his first start on 10 June in a 4–0 win over Bolivia, where he scored his first two international goals.

Even though he had arguably a poor year with Tottenham, Postiga was selected for UEFA Euro 2004. In the tournament he managed to save his team from defeat against England during the quarter-finals, netting an 83rd-minute equaliser to level the score at 1–1 as Portugal would prevail in the penalty shootout 6–5 after a 2–2 draw. He converted his attempt with a "Panenka-style" shot, but did not feature in the final, lost 0–1 to outsiders Greece.

Postiga was subsequently summoned for the 2006 FIFA World Cup side, starting against Mexico in a 2–1 win at the end of the group stage. In the quarter-finals, after replacing captain Luís Figo, he again scored to eliminate England on penalties, as the nation eventually finished fourth.

In Euro 2008, Postiga was also mainly used from the bench. In the quarter-finals against Germany, he scored a late goal by heading in a cross from fellow substitute Nani, although Portugal lost 2–3.

After more than two years of absence from the national team setup, Postiga was called up for two Euro 2012 qualifiers against Denmark and Iceland, in October 2010. On 12 October, against the latter, he netted in a 3–1 away win; on 17 November, he put two past world champions Spain in a 4–0 friendly win in Lisbon.

On 4 June 2011, Postiga scored the only goal in a Euro 2012 qualifier against Norway played at Estádio da Luz, which made him the tenth highest scorer in Portugal's history. He added two on 15 November of that year, in a 6–2 play-off second leg win over Bosnia and Herzegovina which secured a place in the competition.

Selected by Paulo Bento to the finals in Poland and Ukraine as first-choice striker, he netted in the second group stage against Denmark, scoring the second in an eventual 3–2 win. He injured his right thigh in the first half of the national side's 1–0 quarter-final victory over the Czech Republic, which also forced him out of the next match and the rest of the tournament.

Postiga scored six goals in the qualification campaign for the 2014 World Cup. On 6 September 2013, he was sent off in the first half of a 3–2 win away to Northern Ireland for headbutting Gareth McAuley; at the finals, he started the second game against the United States after an injury to Hugo Almeida in the opener, but was himself substituted following 16 minutes due to injury as Portugal were eliminated in the group stage.

Personal life
A childhood fan of S.L. Benfica who went on to play for their two main rivals, Postiga grew up in the Caxinas fishing neighbourhood in Vila do Conde, as did his long-time international teammates Bruno Alves and Fábio Coentrão.

Postiga's younger brother, José, is also a footballer and a forward. He played youth football at Sporting.

Career statistics

Club

International

Source:

International goals
Scores and results list Portugal's goal tally first.

Honours

Club
Porto
Primeira Liga: 2002–03, 2006–07
Taça de Portugal: 2002–03
Supertaça Cândido de Oliveira: 2004
UEFA Cup: 2002–03
Intercontinental Cup: 2004

Sporting
Supertaça Cândido de Oliveira: 2008

Atlético Kolkata
Indian Super League: 2016

International
Portugal
UEFA European Championship runner-up: 2004

Orders
 Medal of Merit, Order of the Immaculate Conception of Vila Viçosa (House of Braganza)

References

External links

1982 births
Living people
People from Vila do Conde
Portuguese footballers
Association football forwards
Primeira Liga players
Segunda Divisão players
FC Porto B players
FC Porto players
UEFA Cup winning players
Sporting CP footballers
Rio Ave F.C. players
Premier League players
Tottenham Hotspur F.C. players
Ligue 1 players
AS Saint-Étienne players
Super League Greece players
Panathinaikos F.C. players
La Liga players
Real Zaragoza players
Valencia CF players
Deportivo de La Coruña players
Serie A players
S.S. Lazio players
Indian Super League players
Indian Super League marquee players
ATK (football club) players
Portugal youth international footballers
Portugal under-21 international footballers
Portugal international footballers
UEFA Euro 2004 players
2006 FIFA World Cup players
UEFA Euro 2008 players
UEFA Euro 2012 players
2014 FIFA World Cup players
Portuguese expatriate footballers
Expatriate footballers in England
Expatriate footballers in France
Expatriate footballers in Greece
Expatriate footballers in Spain
Expatriate footballers in Italy
Expatriate footballers in India
Portuguese expatriate sportspeople in England
Portuguese expatriate sportspeople in France
Portuguese expatriate sportspeople in Greece
Portuguese expatriate sportspeople in Spain
Portuguese expatriate sportspeople in Italy
Portuguese expatriate sportspeople in India
Sportspeople from Porto District